Alexander Macdonald Renwick (1888–1965) was a 20th century Scottish minister and theological author. He served as Moderator of the General Assembly of the Free Church of Scotland in 1931.

Life

Renwick was born in the isolated cottage of Maol-bhuidhe, in Kintail, Ross-shire. In March 1900 his wife is listed as living in Manchester and several sources indicate he was also from there (probably Chorlton-cum-Hardy).

In the First World War he served in the Royal Army Chaplains Department.

He was professor of theology at Edinburgh University he was also a professor at the Free Church College on the Mound in Edinburgh..

In1931 he was elected Moderator of the General Assembly of the Free Church of Scotland, succeeding Rev Robert M. Knox.

In 1957 at the time of his wife's death they were living at 19 Roseburn Cliff in western Edinburgh.

He died in Lochgilphead on 5 February 1965 and is buried in the Grange Cemetery in the south of Edinburgh. The grave lies against the south wall in the south-west corner of the original cemetery near the link to the west extension.

Family

He was married to Celia Ann Grassick (1883-1957) in Chorlton in November 1915.

Publications

The Story of the Church
The Story of the Scottish Reformation

References

1888 births
1965 deaths
People from Chorlton-cum-Hardy
20th-century Ministers of the Free Church of Scotland
Clergy from Manchester